The Dark Harvest Commando of the Scottish Citizen Army was a militant group which in 1981 demanded that the British government decontaminate Gruinard Island, a site which had been used for anthrax weapon testing during World War II, by distributing potentially anthrax-laden soil on the mainland.

The group identified itself as "Dark Harvest Commando" and claimed to include a "team of microbiologists from two universities" in Scotland. They said they had landed on the island with the aid of local people and removed 300 lb (140 kg) of soil contaminated with anthrax spores.

The group placed a container of soil outside the Chemical Defence Establishment at Porton Down in Wiltshire. A second container of soil was placed at Blackpool, a resort town where the Conservative Party was holding a conference. The first container was found to contain Bacillus anthracis (the causative agent of anthrax), while the second was uncontaminated but of the same soil type as found on the island. The island was eventually decontaminated in 1986.

One news source claimed that a resurgent DHC had collected spores from Gruinard Island for an attack on Prince William in December 2001.

In his novel The Impossible Dead (2011), author Ian Rankin, in addition to using the mysterious death of Willie McRae for his plot, also mentions the clandestine events surrounding the removal of contaminated soils from Gruinard Island by the Dark Harvest Commandos and the island's removal from maps by the British Government.

References

Further reading
Story of SNLA. Animal Liberation Front

United Kingdom biological weapons program
Anthrax
Eco-terrorism
Paramilitary organisations based in the United Kingdom
Terrorism in England
Terrorism in Scotland
1981 crimes in the United Kingdom
1981 in England
1981 in Scotland